The Decoration for acknowledgement of excellent deeds performed during a flood disaster, usually called Flood disaster Medal, was created by royal decree on 27 March 1855 by King William III of the Netherlands. The medal is intended for those civilians who have shown zeal, courage, leadership, and self-sacrifice during the event of a flood disaster.

Orders, decorations, and medals of the Netherlands
1855 establishments in the Netherlands